Warsaw Modlin Airport  is an international airport located in the town of Nowy Dwór Mazowiecki, approximately 40 km (25 miles) north of central Warsaw, Poland. The airport is intended to be used by low-cost carriers serving Warsaw. As of 2017, it is the fifth busiest airport in the country, with 2,932,639 passengers served annually. The airport's only regular connections are served by Ryanair, while other carriers, such as Enter Air, operate seasonal services. The main international airport of the city is Warsaw Chopin Airport.

History

Earlier usage 

Originally designed for military use in the Second Polish Republic in 1937, it was not opened by Polish authorities. Instead, it was made operational during World War II in 1940 as an airbase by the German Luftwaffe in occupied Poland. Postwar, between 1945 and 2000, it was used by Polish and Soviet air forces. In 2000, the Polish Ministry of National Defence declared the airfield closed. The airport's runway was in poor condition and lacked proper lighting and modern radio navigation aids such as an Instrument Landing System.

Redevelopment 
Subsequently, much of its original area was made available as capital in a joint management limited liability company created to run the future airport, Port Lotniczy Mazowsze Warszawa-Modlin Sp. z o.o. The airport was converted for civilian use, primarily as a replacement for the now closed Etiuda terminal for low-cost carriers at Warsaw's main airport, this idea emerged in the early 2000s. Numerous projected opening dates had slipped, and business plans with extensive infrastructure improvements, including a new passenger terminal, had been proposed without any actual progress in the construction for some time. An environmental assessment was completed as well. A schedule, announced in February 2008 had the airport opening for business in early 2010. On 8 February 2010, the airport was registered officially as a civil airport by the Polish Aviation Authority (Urząd Lotnictwa Cywilnego).

In September 2009, it was announced that tenders were being accepted and funding had been secured from the EU for an opening in 2011, in time for the Euro 2012 Football Tournament. Construction works finally began in October 2010 and were expected to be completed before Euro 2012; however the deadline was not met and instead the airport began to operate in July 2012.

A new 5 km rail spur branching off from the existing Warsaw–Gdynia line will be built with an underground station at the airport, theoretically providing a 30-minute commute to Warsaw centre.

Although the first aircraft was meant to depart Modlin on 16 July 2012, the airport was officially inaugurated the day before, and the first passenger flight from Budapest arrived at the airport around 17:30. Low-cost-airlines Wizz Air and Ryanair started to use the airport as bases.

Struggle and growth
On 22 December 2012, it was announced that the runway at the airport would be closed to larger aircraft such as the Boeing 737 and Airbus A320 indefinitely for safety reasons. Ryanair confirmed on the day of the runway closure it would divert all aircraft to Warsaw-Chopin Airport until the runway was repaired. Wizz Air also confirmed that it would route its flights to Chopin Airport until Modlin re-opened. The official re-opening took place over six months later on 4 July 2013 after construction works to fix the runway had been completed. On 17 July 2013, Wizz Air announced it would not return to Modlin despite its re-opening, but stay at Warsaw-Chopin Airport instead. Ryanair returned to Modlin on 30 September 2013 and since added more routes to its initial schedule.

On 19 September 2013, the Category I Instrument Landing System was officially ready for use. At the same time tests began for the Category II Instrument Landing System which was ready for use by 1 May 2014.

In October 2015, the airport welcomed its 5th millionth passenger overall. In December of the same year, an airport lounge was inaugurated.

Since the inauguration of the new airport, its only current user Ryanair increased the network served from Modlin to 35 destinations by April 2016. From October 31, 2022, the airport began cooperation with Air Moldova, offering flights to the capital of Moldova, Chisinau.

Facilities

Terminal
The airport features a new, one-storey passenger terminal building containing all departures and arrivals facilities as well as some shops. The apron features stands for 10 aircraft, as there are no jet-bridges, bus and walk boarding is used.

Runway
The airport has one asphalt runway 2,500 m long and 60 m wide at an elevation of 104 m which also features a parallel taxiway on its entire length.

Airlines and destinations

The following airlines operate regular scheduled and charter flights to and from Modlin:

Statistics

Aviation services 
Into-plane fueling services are handled by BGS.

Ground transport

Car
The airport is located 35 km north-west of Warsaw near national road 62, which is connected to motorway S7 that leads to Warsaw city center and Gdańsk.

Coach
Two coach operators, ModlinBus and OKbus, provide services from the airport to Warsaw and Łódź and the towns of Biała Podlaska, Toruń, Ciechocinek, Włocławek, and Płock several times a day.

Train
The airport itself does not have a railway station, however, there are frequent shuttle bus services to the railway station in Modlin (distance of 4 km), where local or long-distance trains depart to Warsaw up to 62 times a day. 21 of these services (every 60 minutes) run via Warsaw Central station to Warsaw Chopin Airport while others terminate at Warsaw West station. In the other direction, most services terminate at Modlin while some continue to Działdowo.

There is however an unelectrified, disused branch line formerly for military use branching off from Modlin railway station to Modlin Airport Parking Lot 7 (with another branch ending near the New Modlin Orthodox cemetery) that can potentially be refurbished and reactivated for passenger service. A future railway station built underneath the Modlin Airport terminal building has been in discussion since December 2009, with a potential connection to Warsaw Chopin Airport via Warsaw city centre by SKM commuter rail estimated to be established only after 2023.

See also
 List of airports in Poland

References

External links

Airports in Poland
Poland–Soviet Union relations
Soviet Air Force bases
Nowy Dwór Mazowiecki County
Buildings and structures in Masovian Voivodeship
Airports established in 2012
Military installations of the Soviet Union in other countries